Barrett Township is a township in Perkins County, in the U.S. state of South Dakota. Its population was 17 as of the 2020 census.

References

Townships in South Dakota
Townships in Perkins County, South Dakota